Abbotsley is a village and civil parish within the Huntingdonshire district of Cambridgeshire, England. It is three miles from St Neots and 14 miles from the county town of Cambridge. At the time of the 2001 census, the resident population was 425 people living in 164 households. increasing to a population of 446 at the 2011 Census.

History
The village's name is derived from 'woodland clearing of a man called Ealdbeald' (Old English personal name Eadbald + lēah) The name is recorded as Adboldesl’ in the 12th century, as Adboldeslee and  Albedesleg in the 13th century, Albo(t)deste(g), Albo(t)desley and Abbodesle in the 13th-14th century, and Abbot(t)esle(y) from late 13th to late 15th century.

Government 

As a civil parish, Abbotsley has a parish council.  Abbotsley parish council comprises seven councillors, a chairman and clerk. The second tier of local government is Huntingdonshire District Council which is a non-metropolitan district of Cambridgeshire and has its headquarters in Huntingdon. Abbotsley is a part of the district ward of Gransden and The Offords and is represented on the district council by two councillors. The highest tier of local government for Abbotsley is Cambridgeshire County Council which has administration buildings in Cambridge.  Abbotsley is a part of the electoral division of Buckden, Gransden and The Offords and is represented on the county council by one councillor. 

Abbotsley was in the historic and administrative county of Huntingdonshire until 1965. From 1965, the village was part of the new administrative county of Huntingdon and Peterborough. Then in 1974, following the Local Government Act 1972, Abbotsley became a part of the county of Cambridgeshire.

At Westminster, Abbotsley is in the parliamentary constituency of Huntingdon. Since 2001 the village has been represented in the House of Commons by Jonathan Djanogly (Conservative).

Geography
Abbotsley village is 14 miles from the county town of Cambridge and 47 miles from London. It is on the B1046 road between Great Gransden and St Neots. The elevation of the parish is between 22 and 60 metres (72–197 feet) above sea level. The subsoil is Oxford and Ampthill clay.

Demography

Population
In the period 1801 to 1901 the population of Abbotsley was recorded every ten years by the UK census. During this time the population was in the range of 287 (the lowest in 1801) and 498 (the highest in 1871).

From 1901, a census was taken every ten years with the exception of 1941 (due to the Second World War).

All population census figures from report Historic Census figures Cambridgeshire to 2011 by Cambridgeshire Insight.

In 2011, the parish covered an area of 

The ethnic group of all residents was white; 78% described themselves as Christian.

Landmarks
A war memorial which stands in the churchyard commemorates Abbotsley men who died in the First and Second World Wars.

19 buildings in Abbotsley are listed (including the church). Among them are four houses along Blacksmiths Lane, nine houses along the High Street, a red telephone box and a table tomb in the churchyard.

Religious sites
St Margaret's Church has stood in Abbotsley since around 1300, though there was a church in the village as early as 1138. The current building was restored in 1854 and 1861 and the tower in 1884; it is a Grade II* listed building. Abbotsley is part of the deanery of St Neots and diocese of Ely.

Culture and community
A village hall is used for meetings, events and private functions. An annual Feast Week and Scarecrow Festival is held to raise money for maintenance of the village hall. Residents construct themed scarecrows and place them outside their houses for a week while there are various fundraising events held.

Michael Palin writer, comedian and TV personality was married at Abbotsley Church.

Neighbouring parishes

References

External links

Villages in Cambridgeshire
Huntingdonshire
Civil parishes in Cambridgeshire